David Hoffmann may refer to:
 David Hoffmann (bodybuilder) (born 1980), German bodybuilder
 David L. Hoffmann, American historian
 David Zvi Hoffmann (1843–1921), Orthodox rabbi and Torah scholar
 Dave Hoffmann (born 1970), American football player

See also
 David Hoffman (disambiguation)